Edmund Paul Lewis (born October 18, 1969), better known as Ted Lewis, is an American voice actor who does work for 4K Media Inc, Central Park Media, TAJ Productions, DuArt Film and Video and NYAV Post. He primarily works as an anime dub voice actor and is best known as the voice of King Dedede from Kirby: Right Back at Ya!, Ryo Bakura from Yu-Gi-Oh! Duel Monsters, and Jack Atlas from Yu-Gi-Oh! 5D's. He was also one of the script writers for Pokémon Chronicles. In 2018, Ted Lewis won two Behind the Voice Actors Awards, both for 'Best Vocal Ensemble in an Anime Feature Film/Special' (for Yu-Gi-Oh!: The Dark Side of Dimensions), though one was a People's Choice award.

Filmography

Anime dubbing 
 Battle Arena Toshinden - Eiji Shinjo
 Birdy the Mighty (OVA) - Hikawa
 Detonator Orgun - Tomoru Shindo/Orgun
 Emma – A Victorian Romance - William Jones
 Genshiken - Manabu Kuchiki
 Giant Robo (NYAV Post dub) - Kalho, Kusama, Shutsu
 Gokudo - Prince Niari
 Gokusen - Teruo Kuma Kumai
 Guardian of Darkness - Koichi
 Here is Greenwood (CPM dub) - Kazuya Hasukawa
 His and Her Circumstances - Atsuya, Kei Arima
 Hi no Tori - Nielsen (Resurrection chapter)
 Ikkitousen: Dragon Destiny - Koukin Shuuyu
 Irresponsible Captain Tylor - Lt. Harold Katori, Additional Voices
 Jungle Emperor Leo: The Movie - Ham Egg
 Kirby: Right Back at Ya! - King Dedede, Escargoon, Escargoon's Mother, Amon, D-Rex (Ep 75-76), Escarsaurus (Ep 76), Escar-Droid (Ep 78), Rekketsu (Ep 83), Crowmon (Ep 87), and Maimaigoon (Ep 88)
 Now and Then, Here and There - Shuzo "Shu" Matsutani
 One Piece - Dalton, Merry
 Magical DoReMi - Ferdagio The Great, Charlie
 Ping Pong Club  - Principal, Additional Voices
 Pokémon - Giovanni, Tracey Sketchit, Additional Voices
 Record of Lodoss War - Etoh
 Revolutionary Girl Utena - Mitsuru Tsuwabuki
 Shaman King - Mikihisa Asakura, Anatel Pokki, Goldva, Allen
 Slayers - Zangulus (14-26)
 Slayers NEXT - Zangulus
 Slayers Revolution - Additional Voices
   Sonic X- Nelson Thorndyke, Yellow Zelkova, President
 The King of Braves GaoGaiGar - Isamu Amami
 Tamagotchi: The Movie - Papamametchi
 Yu-Gi-Oh! - Bakura Ryou, Yami Bakura, Bandit Keith, Alister, Croquet, Thief King Bakura, Gozaburo Kaiba
 Yu-Gi-Oh! GX - Chumley, Admiral, Howard X Miller, Neo Spacian Grand Mole
 Yu-Gi-Oh! 5Ds - Jack Atlas, Mitch, Rex Goodwin (young), Fake Jack Atlas
 Yu-Gi-Oh! ZEXAL – Dempsey Crossit, Cameron Clix
 Yu-Gi-Oh! Arc-V – Jack Atlas
 Yu-Gi-Oh!: The Dark Side of Dimensions – Bakura

Animation 
 Fireflies – Ray Banner

Video games
Pokémon Stadium - Stadium Announcer
Pokémon Stadium 2 - Stadium Announcer
Red Dead Redemption 2 - Danbury
 Yu-Gi-Oh! Capsule Monster Coliseum - Yami Bakura, Ryo Bakura
 Yu-Gi-Oh! Destiny Board Traveler - Yami Bakura
 Yu-Gi-Oh! Duel Links - Yami Bakura, Bandit Keith, (DSOD)Bakura, Jack Atlas

Script Adaptation 
 Funky Cops (4Kids dub)
 Ikki Tousen: Dragon Destiny
 Kirby: Right Back at Ya!
 Magical DoReMi
 Mew Mew Power
 Pokémon Chronicles
 Sonic X

Production Assistant 
 K.O. Beast

Voice Director 
 Pokémon (Season 5)
 Yu-Gi-Oh!

References

External links 

Living people
20th-century American male actors
21st-century American male actors
American male voice actors
Place of birth missing (living people)
American male video game actors
American television writers
American male television writers
American voice directors
1969 births